State Road 568 (NM 568) is a  state highway in the US state of New Mexico. NM 568's southern terminus is a continuation as Forest Service Road 180 at the end of state maintenance northwest of Milan, and the northern terminus is at NM 122 and Historic U.S. Route 66 (Historic US 66) northwest of Milan.

Major intersections

See also

References

568
Transportation in Cibola County, New Mexico